General Enrique Estrada is a city and municipality in the Mexican state of Zacatecas.
It was named for General Enrique Estrada.

References

Populated places in Zacatecas